Kuljani is a village in the municipality of Banja Luka, Republika Srpska, Bosnia and Herzegovina. It lies about 10 km north from the city on the left side of the river Vrbas.

History 
This settlement was known for its catholic population through the last few centuries. Most of the population moved to Croatia during the last civil war in Yugoslavia (1992-1995). After the war this small village started to expand. A large number of new residents were Serbian refugees who found a new place for living after they had lost their old homes during the war. The village began to grow and soon became a suburban part of Banja Luka City.

Public infrastructure 
The road infrastructure is still in very bad shape since there is no budget investment planned. As of 2010, there is a post office in operation and a medical ambulance is in planning to be opened. The old public school is also still operational.

Population

{| border="1" cellpadding="7" cellspacing="0" style="margin: 10px 0 10px 25px; background: #f9f9f9; border: 1px #AAA solid; border-collapse: collapse; font-size: 85%; float: center;"
|-
|style="background: bgcolor="#F5DEB3" | National census|style="background: bgcolor="#C2B280" | 1991 
|style="background: bgcolor="#C2B280" | 1981|style="background: bgcolor="#C2B280" | 1971
 |-
| Croats
|773 (64,04%)
|760 (68,03%)
|736 (85,28%)
|-
| Serbs 
|283 (23,44%) 
|222 (19,87%)
|93 (10,77%)
|-
| Muslim  
|3 (0,24%)
|0
|0
|-
| Yugoslavs
|73 (6,04%)
|101 (9,04%)
|0
|-
| rest and unknown
|75 (6,21%)
|34 (3,04%)
|34 (3,93%)
|-
|style="background: bgcolor="#F5DEB3" |Altogether|1.207|1.117|863'|}

In 2008 the maximal estimated population counted 3,742. There is also a small group of Slovenians in the village.

 Trivia 
A local proverb goes Culjani - selo ljepše od Pariza'' (Kuljani - this village is more beautiful than Paris)

Notes and references

Populated places in Banja Luka
Villages in Republika Srpska